Mehmet Güven (born 30 July 1987) is a Turkish footballer who plays as a midfielder for an amateur side Kavaklıderespor.

Career
Güven is a product of the Galatasaray Youth Team. He joined the senior squad in 2005–06 and made his debut on February 2, 2006, in a cup match at home against Giresunspor.

Honours
Galatasaray
 Süper Lig: 2005–06, 2007–08
 Turkish Super Cup: 2008

Career statistics

External links

1987 births
Sportspeople from Malatya
Living people
Turkish footballers
Turkey youth international footballers
Turkey under-21 international footballers
Turkey B international footballers
Association football midfielders
Galatasaray S.K. footballers
Manisaspor footballers
Eskişehirspor footballers
Konyaspor footballers
Ankaraspor footballers
Giresunspor footballers
Manisa FK footballers
Kahramanmaraşspor footballers
Süper Lig players
TFF First League players
TFF Second League players